The Dexter Building was a landmark building located at 630 South Wabash Avenue, in the South Loop area of Chicago, Illinois. The building was designed by the firm of Dankmar Adler and Louis Sullivan, and built in 1887. Prior to its destruction in 2006 it was one of the earliest surviving Louis Sullivan buildings, and was considered a precursor of the nearby Auditorium Building. It was designated as a Chicago Landmark in 1996 and was described by the Landmarks Division of the City of Chicago Department of Planning and Development as an "irreplaceable link in the chain of work of one of the nation's most important architectural partnerships". It was distinctive in its use of exterior perforated girders, prefiguring designs of seven decades later.

History
Architects Dankmar Adler and Louis Sullivan designed the Wirt Dexter Building as a warehouse and a furniture store for Wirt Dexter Walker, a prestigious lawyer in 1887, twelve years before his death. This building housed many businesses all around the years, from 1967 it was the home of the George Diamond Steak House, and the upper floors later housed the Sawyer Secretarial College.

Fire
On October 24, 2006, workmen were cutting up a boiler in the basement for scrapping with acetylene torches that sparked a large fire. The fire was allowed to get out of control and gutted the building. At its peak, the fire, which started in the basement at around 3 pm, was a five-alarm fire, the Chicago Fire Department's highest level of alert, with over 250 firefighters responding. Following the fire, the surviving shell of the building was too unstable to save and was demolished. At the time of the fire there was no insurance on the building.

In popular culture
The Wirt Dexter Building can be seen in the near background of one scene in the 2001 movie Just Visiting.

References

External links
Article about the fire by Lynn Becker
Save a Landmark; Put Down the Blowtorch, Landmarks Illinois: Article about the fire and use of acetylene torches in rehabilitating historic buildings, with pictures

Industrial buildings completed in 1887
Former buildings and structures in Chicago
Chicago Landmarks
Louis Sullivan buildings
Burned buildings and structures in the United States
Demolished buildings and structures in Chicago